The 2001 CAF Super Cup was the ninth CAF Super Cup, an annual football match in Africa organized by the Confederation of African Football (CAF), between the winners of the previous season's two CAF club competitions, the African Cup of Champions Clubs and the African Cup Winners' Cup.

Teams

Match details

Source:

References

External links 
 http://www.cafonline.com/competition/super-cup_2009/pastcomp/2000

2001
Super
2000–01 in Egyptian football
Zamalek SC matches
Accra Hearts of Oak S.C. matches
February 2001 sports events in Africa